The 2016–17 network television schedule for the five major English commercial broadcast networks in Canada covers primetime hours from September 2016 through August 2017. The schedule is followed by a list per network of returning series, new series, and series canceled after the 2015-16 television season, for Canadian, American and other series.

CBC Television was first to announce its fall schedule on May 26, 2016, followed by CTV and CTV Two, as well as City on May 30, 2016, and Global on June 9, 2016. As in the past, the commercial networks' announcements come shortly after the networks have had a chance to buy Canadian rights to new American series.

CTV Two and Global are not included on Saturday as they do not carry network programming.

Schedule 
 New series are highlighted in bold. Series that have changed network are not highlighted as new series.
 All times given are in Canadian Eastern Time and Pacific Time (except for some live events or specials). 
Most CBC programming airs at the same local time in all time zones, except Newfoundland time (add 30 minutes).
For commercial stations in the Central Time Zone, subtract one hour.
For commercial stations in the Atlantic and Mountain time zones, add one hour for programming between 8:00 and 10:00 PM. Programs airing at 10:00 PM ET/PT will generally air at 8:00 PM local on stations in these areas. For viewers in the Newfoundland time zone, add an additional 30 minutes to the Atlantic time schedule. 
Notwithstanding the above, timeslots may occasionally vary further in some areas due to local simultaneous substitution considerations, compliance with watershed restrictions, or other factors.

Legend 
 Light blue indicates Local Programming.
 Grey indicates Encore Programming.
 Light green indicates sporting events.
 Orange indicates movies.
 Red indicates Canadian content shows, which is programming that originated in Canada.
 Magenta indicates series being burned off and other irregularly scheduled programs, including specials.
 Cyan indicates various programming.
 Light yellow indicates the current schedule.

Sunday

Monday

Tuesday

Wednesday

Thursday

Friday

Saturday

By network

CBC

City

CTV/CTV Two

Comedies
American Housewife (October 11, 2016 – present)
The Big Bang Theory (September 23, 2007 – present)
The Goldbergs (September 26, 2013 – present)

Dramas
Agents of S.H.I.E.L.D. (September 24, 2013 – present)
Arrow (September 24, 2012 – present)
Blindspot (September 21, 2015 – present)
Blue Bloods (September 24, 2010 – present)
Castle (September 29, 2009 – present)
Code Black (September 29, 2015 – present)
Conviction (October 3, 2016 – present)
Criminal Minds (September 21, 2005 – present)
Designated Survivor (September 23, 2016 – present)
The Exorcist (September 23, 2016 – present)
The Flash (January 17, 2015 – present)
Gotham (September 22, 2014 – present)
Grimm (October 28, 2011 – present)
How to Get Away With Murder (September 25, 2014 – present)
Law & Order: Special Victims Unit (September 19, 1999 – present)
Legends of Tomorrow (January 12, 2016 – present)
Lucifer (January 26, 2016 – present)
Once Upon a Time (September 25, 2011 – present)
Quantico (September 27, 2015 – present)
Secrets and Lies (July 19, 2015 – present)
This Is Us (September 21, 2016 – present)

Upcoming Programming
The Mick (2017)
Time After Time (2017)

Global

Comedy Programming
The Great Indoors (October 27, 2016 – present)
The Good Place (September 22, 2016 – present)
Kevin Can Wait (September 19, 2016 – present)
Man with a Plan (October 24, 2016 – present)
The Simpsons (December 19, 1989 – present)
Superstore (December 1, 2015 – present)

Drama Programming
The Blacklist (September 23, 2013 – present)
Bones (September 12, 2005 – present)
Bull (September 21, 2016 – present)
Chicago Fire (September 18, 2012 – present)
Chicago Med (November 19, 2015 – present)
Chicago P.D. (January 19, 2014 – present)
Elementary (September 20, 2012 – present)
Hawaii Five-0 (September 20, 2010 – present)
MacGyver (September 23, 2016 – present)
Madam Secretary (September 28, 2014 – present)
NCIS (September 24, 2004 – present)
NCIS: Los Angeles (September 22, 2009 – present)
NCIS: New Orleans (September 21, 2014 – present)
Pitch (September 22, 2016 – present)
Pure Genius (October 27, 2016 – present)
Timeless (October 3, 2016 – present)

Upcoming Programming
Doubt (2017)
Great News (2017)
Powerless (2017)
Training Day (2017)
Trial & Error (2017)

See also
2016–17 United States network television schedule

References

 
 
Canadian television schedules